Reyn may refer to
The Rhine, a river in Europe
Reyn, a unit of viscosity
Reyn Ouwehand, Dutch record producer, multi-instrumentalist and composer
Reyn, a character from Xenoblade Chronicles.

See also
 Rhene